Sylmar is a suburban neighborhood in the San Fernando Valley and is the northernmost neighborhood within the City of Los Angeles. Historically known for its profusion of sylvan olive orchards, Sylmar can trace its past to the 18th century and the founding of the San Fernando Mission. In 1890, olive production was begun systematically. The Sylmar climate was also considered healthy, and so a sanitarium was established, the first in a series of hospitals in the neighborhood. There are fourteen public and eight private schools within Sylmar.

History

Naming
San Fernando became a city in 1874, leading to the naming of the unincorporated land surrounding San Fernando as Morningside. In 1893 the area was named Sylmar, a fusion of two Latin words for "trees" and "sea".

Around 2000, some residents proposed a plan to rename the northwest portion of the district as Rancho Cascades. The name change was approved in 2018.

Sylmar has been nicknamed "The Top of Los Angeles."

Olives
The foothills of the San Gabriel Mountains at the north edge of the San Fernando Valley was perceived as "an unattractive and apparently worthless waste" before 2,000 acres (810 ha) were transformed in the late 1890s by the Los Angeles Olive Growers Association. One observer recalled that the land had been "a mass of ill-looking chapparel [sic] and chemisal"[sic] before it was planted with olives.

In 1893, a group of Illinois businessmen purchased from the trustees of the Maclay ranch either 1,000 or 2,000 acres (405 or 810 ha) — the sources differ — east of the railroad tracks on San Fernando Road just south of Roxford Street and in 1894 began planting olives trees on up to 1,700 acres (690 ha). Experts were brought from France to supervise the work. Calling themselves the Los Angeles Olive Growers Association (in 1898 C.O. (Paul) Milltimore was the president and George L. Arnold the secretary), they built a packing plant and sold olives under the Tyler Olives label, later changing to the Sylmar Packing label. Sylmar's olives became noted throughout the state for sweetness and purity. Chinese pickers were hired to harvest the crops, and up to 800 U.S. gallons (3,000 L) of olive oil a day were produced. The pickling plant was located on the corner of Roxford Street and San Fernando Road. By March 1898 about 200,000 trees had been planted, and by 1906 the property had become the largest olive grove in the world.

One source stated in 1981 that it was the "Fusano family" who built a headquarters building for the olive association on Roxford and San Fernando in 1902 and that the first packing plant was built in 1909. The first groves were planted with Mission, Nevadillo Blanco and Manzanillo olives. Some Sevillano and Ascolano varieties were planted for extra-large fruit.

During the picking season in the early 1900s, an extra force of 300 Japanese was employed and housed in a village of tents. In 1927 the packing plant, which had been built in 1910, employed some five hundred workers during its busiest season, November through January. The oil was pressed from the fruit, allowed to separate from the fruit's water content, then drawn into 12,000-gallon concrete tanks lined with glass and set deep into the ground to avoid a temperature change. Over time, the plant expanded its activities, bringing in figs, pimientos and watermelon rind from the San Joaquin Valley for processing.

In 1904 the Sylmar brand olive oil won first place at the Louisiana Purchase Exposition, St. Louis, Missouri; in 1906 at the Lewis and Clark Centennial Exposition, Portland, Oregon; and in 1915 at the Panama–Pacific International Exposition in San Francisco.

In 1922, the controlling interest in the Los Angeles Olive Growers' Association, which had been held by the estate of F.D. Butterfield (Charlotte M. Butterfield, the heir), was bought by Charles C. Moore of San Francisco, and its name was changed to Sylmar Packing Corporation. The management remained with Frank Simonds, who was president of the association. At that time there were 140,000 trees on the property.

Some of the olive trees were still growing in Sylmar decades after they were planted. In 1963, twenty-five mature olive trees were removed from the site of the Sylmar Juvenile Hall, then under construction (below), to be planted at Busch Gardens, an entertainment center in Van Nuys.

Disasters and mishaps

1971 earthquake

At 6:01 a.m. on February 9, a magnitude 6.5 earthquake hit the Sylmar area on a thrust fault located below the neighborhood. Known as the San Fernando earthquake or the Sylmar earthquake, it caused 58 deaths and more than $500 million in damage. Three people died at the Olive View Medical Center, including two patients on life-support systems that failed when auxiliary generators did not start. The third was an ambulance driver who was crushed by a falling wall. A hospital building sank a foot into the ground. About 600 patients were evacuated, 200 of them into a parking lot. A Boys Market was jolted off its foundation and collapsed. The Sylmar juvenile hall was severely damaged. One of its buildings sank "almost to the ceiling."

Two weeks later, normalcy had returned to many in the San Fernando Valley, but in Sylmar, according to The New York Times,The community looks like a battlefield. Dozens of houses are twisted beyond repair. Families camp out in tents or trailers on front lawns, afraid to return even to those houses not condemned ... All homes have been without water for drinking, cooking and flushing toilets, although some service has been restored in the last few days. There is no gas, no heat. Telephones are still out. Housewives must travel out of the community to find grocery stores that are still open. On top of that, Sylmar feels that it has been forgotten ...

Portable toilets were placed on street corners. Water was distributed to residents via taps attached to huge tank cars of the Joseph Schlitz Brewing Company. Many residents moved away from Sylmar, either from fear of more earthquakes or because their homes were destroyed. People bathed in the Pacoima Wash. Streets were buckled like washboards, with fissures up to a foot wide. On February 21, 1971, a rally of 1,500 people was held at a Little League Baseball field to demand help from the government. Some government assistance and loans were indeed given to aid residents and to help rebuild.

1971 explosion
Four months after the 1971 Sylmar earthquake, a methane gas explosion in a water tunnel being drilled beneath Sylmar killed 17 workers on June 24. It was the worst tunneling disaster in California history. It resulted in the state adopting the toughest mining and tunnel regulations in the nation and establishing its occupational safety division, commonly known as Cal/OSHA. The incident resulted in a 54-week criminal trial against the Lockheed Shipbuilding and Construction Company — the longest municipal court trial in U.S. history. The result was some of the highest municipal fines and greatest civil damage awards of that era. Nineteen Los Angeles firefighters were awarded the Medal of Valor for their work that day, a record for a single incident. The operator of the supply locomotive in and out of the tunnel — a worker named Ralph Brissette, 33 — was the only survivor; Brissette died at 81 in September 2019.

The 22-foot-diameter (6.7 m), 5-mile-long (8.0 km), $19.3 million tunnel was being constructed as part of the California Water Project, which carries water from the Sacramento–San Joaquin River Delta through the San Joaquin Valley to southern California.

1994 earthquake

The 1994 Northridge earthquake caused a large amount of damage in Sylmar.

2000 midair collision
Two light airplanes collided over the Newhall Pass on February 7, 2000, and fell to earth in or near the Cascades Golf Club in Sylmar. Pilots Charles Oliver and Tom Quist and their passengers, Jean Bustos and Kevin Kaff, were killed.

2008 wildfires
Two wildfires raged in Sylmar in 2008: the Marek and the Sayre Fires. The Marek Fire ignited on 10/12/08 and burned 4,824 acres (1,952 ha). There was one human fatality: a homeless man who lived in a shed died along with his dog. The Sky Terrace Mobile Home Park on the top of Lopez Canyon Boulevard in Sylmar, adjacent to Lakeview Terrace, lost all but eight mobile homes. The residents who lost homes in this fire did not receive any FEMA assistance. Almost exactly one month later, on 15 November 2008, the Sayre Fire occurred. The Oakridge Mobile Home Village was almost completely burned down. Over 11,200 acres (4,500 ha) burned. Oakridge residents received FEMA help.

The Sayre Fire was a November 2008 wildfire that resulted in the loss of 489 residences in or near Sylmar, the "worst loss of homes due to fire" in Los Angeles's history. The fire was first reported at 10:29 p.m. on November 14, 2008. It was not contained until November 20, 2008, and by then it had burned  and destroyed more than 600 structures: 480 mobile homes, nine single-family homes, 104 outbuildings and 10 commercial buildings. Numerous schools in the area were closed during and for a few days following the fire, with air quality and other concerns being cited. Five firefighters and one civilian suffered minor injuries.

Crime
Sylmar is serviced by the Mission Community Police Station of the Los Angeles Police Department.

Drugs
Tipped off by a Sylmar resident, dozens of investigators from at least five police departments and three federal agencies raided a warehouse at 12898 Bradley Street, on September 29, 1989, and seized some 21.4 tons of cocaine and $10 million in cash. It was the largest confiscation of the drug in history, estimated at $6.9 billion, enough for 1.38 billion doses. Three men were convicted on drug charges in 1990. Carlos Tapia Ponce, the warehouse manager, was given a life term, and in 2016 he died in prison at the age of 94. Other culprits were convicted later.

Drag races and automobile cruising
Illegal street drag races and automobile cruising still troubles areas in Sylmar and adjacent San Fernando. In 1988, officers arrested a man who pointed a high-powered spotlight at a police helicopter monitoring one of them on San Fernando Road near Roxford Street. In 1993 it was reported that drag racing had been going on since the early 1970s, drawing hundreds of youths, and that the most popular "speed strip" was San Fernando Road near Balboa Boulevard. There had been four deaths within the previous two years. In one, a teenager speeding to the site rear-ended a car carrying a family of four, killing a mother and injuring her husband and two children. In 1997 Kenneth Acosta, 21, of Sylmar was charged with involuntary manslaughter after a drag race on the 118 Freeway resulted in an accident that caused the deaths of three people, all of them former members of the Sylmar High School band. He was granted probation and required to spend 250 hours talking to others about his crime.

In 1994, city officials declared one of the most popular cruising spots in the San Fernando Valley — La Rinda Plaza at Laurel Canyon Boulevard and Workman Street — to be a public nuisance and ordered its owners to install overhead lighting, post security guards and install gates that could be closed at night. Illegal street racing or high-speed figure 8's are frequently heard by residents near the Sylmar Public Library.

Other
In 1991, the Sylmar area led the northeast Valley communities (which includes Sunland-Tujunga, Lake View Terrace and Pacoima) in residential burglaries and thefts from motor vehicles.

Population
The population of the Sylmar area was roughly 3,500 in 1940, 10,000 in 1950, 31,000 in 1962, 40,000 in 1972, 41,922 in 1980 and 53,392 in 1986. By 2000, a "wave of immigrants and working poor" had enveloped Sylmar, Pacoima, Arleta and Sun Valley, resulting in a housing shortage for lower-income people. The 2000 U.S. census counted 69,499 residents in the 12.46-square-mile Sylmar neighborhood—or 5,579 people per square mile, among the lowest population densities for the city. In 2008, the city estimated that the population had increased to 79,614. In 2009, the Sylmar Chamber of Commerce estimated that the population was approximately 90,000 residents.

In 1980 Sylmar was predominantly white, the ethnic breakdown being 58% white and 36% Latino. Twenty years later, in 2000, the neighborhood was considered "moderately diverse" ethnically within Los Angeles, with a relatively high percentage of Latinos. The breakdown in 2000 was Latinos, 69.8%; whites, 20.7%; blacks, 4.1%; Asians, 3.4%, and others, 2.0%. Mexico (71.7%) and El Salvador (8.4%) were the most common places of birth for the 36.7% of the residents who were born abroad, an average figure for Los Angeles. In 2000 the median age for residents was 28, considered young for city and county neighborhoods.

In 2000, renters occupied 29.2% of the housing stock, and house- or apartment-owners held 70.8%. The average household size of 3.6 people was considered high for Los Angeles. The percentage of married women (55.5%) was among the county's highest. There were 3,607 veterans, or 7.7% of the population, average for the city of Los Angeles and the county.

A study by four graduate students from the University of Southern California in 2005 stated that:
Sylmar in the 1970s and 1980s was a rural, predominantly white, non-Hispanic community, whose residents focused on creating a place centered around equestrian activities. Today, the dramatic influx of residents has serious consequences for a community that has too little housing stock, too few employment opportunities, overburdened public facilities and decaying public infrastructure systems.

The median yearly household income in 2008 dollars was $65,783, considered average for the city.

Topography and climate
The slopes steepen into the San Gabriel Mountains on the north side of Sylmar resulting in steep residential streets with homes built on man-made terraces.

The Valley shares the Los Angeles Basin's dry, sunny weather, with only 17 inches (430 mm) annual precipitation on average. Snow in the San Fernando Valley is extremely rare, though the neighboring Angeles National Forest is capped with snow every winter.

Although Sylmar is only 20 miles (32 km) from the Pacific Ocean, the Valley can be considerably hotter than the Los Angeles Basin during the summer months and cooler during the winter months. The average high temperature in summer is 95 °F (35 °C), dropping down to 68 °F (20 °C). In winter, the average high is 66 °F (19 °C) and average low is 40 °F (4 °C).

Geography

Situation
Sylmar touches the unincorporated Tujunga Canyons on the north, Lopez and Kagel canyons on the east, the city of San Fernando on the southeast, Mission Hills on the south, and Granada Hills on the southwest and west.

Land use

Prewar
The plan of the Olive Growers association in 1898 was to divide the area into 40-acre (16 ha) blocks bounded by "broad drives," and within them 5-acre (2.0 ha) blocks would be laid out, "each one of which is upon a street." About a hundred trees would be planted on each acre. Half of these lands were placed on the market in 1897-98 at $350 an acre (0.4 ha), with a minimum purchase of five acres. The terms were $350 in cash and $350 a year until paid for. The Olive Growers group would take care of the groves and, "When the premises are turned over to the purchaser at the end of four years, it is an established, profit-yielding property, without incumbrance." There is no record as to the results of this plan.

In 1922 the Taft Realty Company of Hollywood purchased 300 acres (120 ha) from Ben F. Porter and divided them into tracts containing 1–15 acres (0.40–6.07 ha) each, which it planned to make into a townsite called Sylmar. Part of the acreage contained orange and lemon trees, and the rest had been used by the Ryan Wholesale and Produce Company for garden and truck farming. The land lay directly across the San Fernando Boulevard from the Sylmar olive grove and packing plant. A later advertisement stated the name of the subdivision as "Sylmar Acres," with "city lots" selling for $450 to $550.

The property of the Sylmar Packing Corporation, with frontage of more than 4.5 miles on Foothill Boulevard, was offered for sale in October 1938. At that time it was planted in olives, lemons, oranges and figs. A 40-acre (16 ha) section was to be set aside for a new townsite called Olive View and the rest subdivided into 5- and 10-acre (2- and 4-ha) farm lots, with many streets already paved and public utilities installed. In the same month, manufacturer and landowner John R. Stetson announced his 200-acre (81 ha) property adjoining the Sylmar ranch would also be divided and offered for sale.

Postwar
A May 1962 proposal by the city Planning Department for an increase in density was met with disapproval by residents at a community meeting. The city's master plan for the area called for much of the agricultural land to be converted to suburban uses, plus zoning that would permit more apartments. There would also be expansion of industrial districts and more shopping centers. The plan proposed that the 4,500 acres then zoned for agriculture be reduced to 2,000, or 17% of the area. City officials said that Sylmar had been the slowest of all San Fernando Valley communities to develop its multiple dwelling areas, with permits issued for only 35 units in 1961 and 70 units in 1962.

Sylmar's major growth came after the 1963 completion of the interchange between the Golden State Freeway and San Diego Freeway and the 1981 completion of the Foothill Freeway and 118 Freeway, which made the community easier to reach.

In 1971 city planners presented a land-use document that would preserve Sylmar's image as one of "houses, horses and orchards" and would roll back the then-existing projection from 90,000 residents by 1990 to 53,500. The population actually reached 53,392 in 1986.

A proposal in 1980 to build an 80-unit low-income housing project near Sylmar High School at 13080-90 Dronfield Avenue was rejected by the Los Angeles City Housing Commission after eight thousand signatures were gathered against the plan and protesters filled a hearing in the high school auditorium.

In 1984 Sylmar was still largely rural, but there was an area of industrial development in its southeastern portion. In 1986, when its population was given 53,392, it still had some of the last large tracts of undeveloped land in the city, and the opening of the Foothill Freeway had placed it within a 45-minute drive of Downtown Los Angeles. Despite the population increase and a rise in the number of people living in condos and apartments, it was still one of the least-crowded areas of the city. Between 1980 and 1990 it was the fastest-growing area in the San Fernando Valley: Its population increased by 30.7% during those ten years in which the Valley itself grew by only 12.2%.

Reopening of the Olive View Medical Center in 1986 was seen as an impetus to population and business growth, as well as a threat to the horse-owning community. Practically every corner on Foothill Boulevard had been purchased for development, and a 109-room hotel was planned at Roxford Street, a block from the hospital. "We are bound to be concerned any time you start bringing sick people, mentally ill people, indigent people into our community," said one community activist. "We welcome the hospital, but that doesn't mean we are going to sit back and let the influx of people change our life style."

By 2006 Sylmar's open spaces were being rapidly subdivided. Resident Bart Reed noted that Sylmar was the last place in Los Angeles "where a builder can find a single-family home on half an acre. They can tear them down and build 52 homes" in their place. Longtime residents were concerned that the expansion would threaten their equestrian lifestyle in a community that still retained a largely rural atmosphere with corrals on large lots and horse trails that wound into the nearby San Gabriel Mountains.

Institutions
Sylmar has been the site of several public institutions.

Olive View Hospital

Construction
Plans for a "tubercular home" to be established on a 414-acre (168 ha) or 453-acre (183 ha) Sylmar ranch purchased from John T. Wilson for $12,300 were announced in 1917. The hospital was to be jointly funded by Los Angeles, Santa Barbara and Ventura counties, but this proposal for joint use was later abandoned.

Olive View Hospital was operated as a branch of the Los Angeles County Hospital, and the sanatorium was built at an elevation of 414 feet (126 m); its property included not only "some picturesque canyons", but also 60 acres (24 ha) of level land "that will be well adapted for fruits, gardening and extensive chicken-raising", whose purpose would be "to give some employment to patients who are able to work, this being considered a beneficial factor in their treatment." Preparations for the construction, estimated to cost about $250,000, included reforestation of the foothills. A contemporary newspaper account noted that "Right through the grounds ... passes the great pipe line of the Los Angeles Aqueduct. Near at hand is also the pipe line for natural gas from the Kern County fields, and overhead runs the transmission line for the municipal electric system."

Fire and earthquake
In 1962, fire rushed down Placerita Canyon and destroyed all the clinics, a dental suite and some other buildings. By 1965, plans were under way to improve the campus with $20 million in new construction. In 1967 the construction cost had risen to $23 million for the six-story facility, which was planned to be the largest treatment center for respiratory ailments west of the Mississippi River. The hospital, which also housed a 30-bed psychiatric unit, opened in October 1970.

On February 9, 1971, the new hospital was destroyed by earthquake (above)  "It was like a bombshell scoring a direct hit," said a spokesman for the Los Angeles County Engineer's office. Two patients and an employee died. Work to rebuild the hospital began, but was halted for a time in June 1978 after California voters passed Proposition 13, which sharply limited the amount of money that could be assessed by local communities. Eventually, the new $120 million hospital was completed, and it was opened in May 1987.

Name change
The hospital was renamed Olive View–UCLA Medical Center on May 19, 1992, in recognition of its affiliation with the UCLA School of Medicine, which included the training of interns and residents.

El Retiro School for Girls

El Retiro School for Girls was a boarding school for girls who had been made wards of the Los Angeles County court system. It opened in 1919 and closed in 1961.

Juvenile hall

Construction
In 1960, the Los Angeles County Probation Department's proposal to build a branch juvenile hall on the north side of San Fernando Road between Filbert and Yarnell streets brought opposition from more than a thousand Sylmar residents, who were supported by the Sylmar Civic Association. The county purchased 3 acres (1.2 ha) of the property needed but had to resort to a condemnation suit against landowners Samuel and Eva DeRose for an additional 27.5 acres (11.1 ha) of a former olive grove before a settlement was reached in August 1962. Ground was broken for the project on June 5, 1963. The first inmate was housed in the completed $5 million project at 15900 Filbert Street on July 6, 1965.

Overcrowding
Within a year after its opening, the facility was vastly overcrowded, as more than thirty children were forced to sleep on floors. The facility had been built with a maximum capacity of 411 beds and it had been designed so that each child would have a private room, but in March 1966 there were 443 in residence; Superintendent Milner M. Clary said the place was "hanging on the ropes," suffering a "buildup of tensions, a loss of classroom time and curtailed recreation."

In 1990, the place had enough private rooms for 393 youths but hundreds more had to sleep in open day rooms, which were also used for eating, relaxing, and watching television. Silence was often enforced, and officers kept watch for signs of gang identification. Clothes were taken away at night to prevent escape or suicide attempts.

Escapes
Although Superintendent Clary said in April 1965 that the risk of juveniles escaping was minimal, a year later a Los Angeles police sergeant complained that "too many boys are getting out." Four boys went over a 14-foot (4.27 m) wall in one incident, and a dozen officers had to capture them. From 12 to 40 children escaped from the campus during the first year of its operation. In the 1971 San Fernando earthquake, 106 of the 305 youths in the facility escaped during evacuation of the buildings, which were severely damaged.

Government and infrastructure

Local government
In 1943 Sylmar volunteers, with cooperation from the city fire department, established their own branch station at 15097 Roxford Street, principally because Sylmar at that time was separated from other stations by railroad tracks.

Today, the Los Angeles Fire Department operates Fire Station 91 in Sylmar. The Los Angeles Police Department operates the Mission Community Police Station in Mission Hills, serving Sylmar.

County, state, and federal offices
The Los Angeles County Department of Health Services operates the Pacoima Health Center in Pacoima, serving Sylmar.

 The United States Postal Service Sylmar Post Office is located at 13700 Foothill Boulevard.
 Fire protection for the mountains around and above Sylmar is provided by the Los Angeles Fire Department and the United States Forest Service.

Chamber of Commerce
The Sylmar Chamber of Commerce was organized in March 1958, with temporary headquarters at 14113 Foothill Boulevard to succeed the Sylmar Civic Association in working for community betterment. Organizers were A.M. Powers, William Watkins, C.R. Fairchild, and Oscar Jorgenson. The organization became inactive but was then refashioned in December 1959 under the temporary chairmanship of Robert Kramer.

Highways
The community of Sylmar is serviced by the Golden State Freeway (Interstate 5), Foothill Freeway (Interstate 210), and San Diego Freeway (Interstate 405).

Public transportation
Public transportation is provided by Metro for bus services and Metrolink for commuter rail service on the Antelope Valley Line at the Sylmar/San Fernando station. Metro Rapid bus lines 761 operate on San Fernando Road and Van Nuys Boulevard, respectively. Los Angeles Metro Bus lines 224, 230, 234, 235, 236, 294 and 690 operate on various streets in Sylmar. Los Angeles Department of Transportation (LADOT) also operates a commuter bus, line 574, to the Los Angeles International Airport area and El Segundo from the station, and the DASH Sylmar from Sylmar Station to Los Angeles Mission College. In 2027, Metro will open the East San Fernando Valley Transit Corridor light rail project with a station at Sylmar/San Fernando station.

Federal representation
Sylmar is represented in the United States Senate by California's Senators Dianne Feinstein and Alex Padilla.
Sylmar is located within California's 29th congressional district represented by Democrat Tony Cárdenas.

State representation
Sylmar is located within California's 39th State Assembly district represented by Democrat Luz Rivas and California's 18th State Senate district represented by Democrat Robert Hertzberg.

Local representation
Sylmar is located within Los Angeles City Council District 7 represented by Monica Rodriguez.

Education
Eleven percent of Sylmar residents aged 25 and older had earned a four-year degree by 2000, one of the lowest percentages for the city and the county.

Schools
Schools within the Sylmar boundaries are:

Public
 Los Angeles Mission College, 13356 Eldrige Avenue
 Sylmar Senior High School, 13050 Borden Avenue (opened in 1961)
 PUC Triumph Charter High School, 13361 Glenoaks Boulevard
 Evergreen Continuation School, 13101 Dronfield Avenue
 Olive Vista Middle School, 14600 Tyler Street (opened in 1958)
 PUC Triumph Academy, charter middle school, 13361 Glenoaks Blvd.
 PUC Lakeview Charter High School, 13361 Glenoaks Boulevard
 PUC Community Charter Elementary School, 14019 Sayre Street
 Hubbard Street Elementary School, 13325 Hubbard Street
 Barry J. Nidorf Juvenile Hall, 16350 Filbert Street
 Herrick Avenue Elementary School, 13350 Herrick Avenue
 Sylmar Elementary School, 13291 Phillippi Avenue (opened in 1946)
 Harding Street Elementary School, 13060 Harding Street
 El Dorado Avenue Elementary School, 12749 El Dorado Avenue
 Dyer Street Elementary School, 14500 Dyer Street
 Osceola Street Elementary School, 14940 Osceola Street
 Vista del Valle Dual Language Academy, 12441 Bromont Avenue
 Sylmar Biotech Health Academy, 13050 Borden Avenue (est. 2012)
 Options for Youth (OFY), 13752 Foothill Blvd
 Discovery Charter Preparatory School, 13570 Eldridge Avenue (moved here in 2016)

Private
 First Lutheran High School, 13361 Glenoaks Boulevard
 Concordia Junior-Senior High School, 13570 Eldridge Avenue. The school was formed by the merger of Los Angeles Lutheran High School and First Lutheran San Fernando. As of 2011 it had 260 students, making it the largest of the campuses of the system. Los Angeles Lutheran was located where Concordia Junior Senior High was later established. It closed in 2016.
 St. Anne's Academy, 13982 Tucker Avenue
 Our Lady of Victory School, K–12, 14024 Bridle Ridge Road
 Sunland Christian School, K–12, 13216 Leach Street
 Poverello of Assisi Preschool, 13367 Borden Avenue
 Park Montessori Children's Center, 13130 Herrick Avenue
 St. Didacus Elementary School, 14325 Astoria Street

Public libraries

Los Angeles Public Library operates the Sylmar Branch Library on the corner of Polk Street and Glenoaks Boulevard.

Culture

Sylmar is home to the Nethercutt Collection, a museum best known for its collection of classic automobiles. The Nethercutt museum also houses collections of mechanical musical instruments, including orchestrions, player pianos and music boxes, antique furniture, and a historical locomotive and train car.

Historical landmarks
 A channel, or spillway, called the Cascades marks the terminus of the Los Angeles Aqueduct system, which brings water  from the Owens Valley to the Van Norman Reservoir in Granada Hills. The channel is a Los Angeles Historic-Cultural Monument No. 742 and California Historical Landmark No. 653. It is also on the List of Historic Civil Engineering Landmarks.
 The San Fernando Pioneer Memorial Cemetery at 14400 Foothill Boulevard is the oldest nonsectarian cemetery in the San Fernando Valley, with the first burial recorded in 1892. It was listed as a Los Angeles Historic-Cultural Monument in 1993. As San Fernando Cemetery, it is a California Historical Landmark.

Parks and recreation
The City of Los Angeles Sylmar Recreation Center, which also functions as a Los Angeles Police Department stop-in center, includes auditoriums, a lighted baseball diamond, lighted outdoor basketball courts, a children's play area, a community room, an indoor gymnasium without weights, picnic tables, an unlighted soccer field, and lighted tennis courts. The city also operates the Stetson Ranch Park., one of the city's two equestrian parks.

Los Angeles County operates the  El Cariso Community Regional Park, which was dedicated to the twelve fallen firefighters and survivors, members of the El Cariso Hotshots, an interagency hotshot crew in the Loop Fire in 1966. The park has a lighted ball diamond, a basketball court, tennis courts, children's play areas, a community building, horseshoe pits, an indoor kitchen, picnic areas for large groups, picnic tables and shelters, and a swimming pool.

In addition the county operates the  Veterans Park in an area adjacent to and outside of the Los Angeles City limits. The site of the park was the site of a veterans hospital that was built in the 1920s and closed in 1971 due to an earthquake that killed many veterans and employees at the hospital. The park, which was dedicated in 1979, has barbecue braziers, group camping areas, a community building, a disc golf course, picnic areas, a picnic pavilion, and toilets.

The Sylmar Hang Gliding Association operates their Sylmar Flight Park on Gridley Street near Simshaw Ave. Visitors can watch the activities most afternoons.

Notable people
Mack Ray Edwards (1918–1971), child sex abuser/serial killer; committed suicide by hanging in his prison cell
Alex Mejia (professional baseball player, born in Sylmar)
Pete Redfern (professional baseball player)

Trivia
The cover of The Doobie Brothers' album, The Captain and Me was photographed underneath an overpass on Interstate 5 in Sylmar that had collapsed during the 1971 earthquake.

See also
 Pacific Converter station (electrical)

References and notes

External links

 Comments about living in Sylmar
 Sylmar crime map, articles and statistics
 Sylmar Hang Gliding Association
 Personal stories and a half-hour documentary about the Sylmar earthquake of 1971

 
1890 establishments in California
Communities in the San Fernando Valley
Neighborhoods in Los Angeles
Populated places established in 1890